Lev Nikolaevich Lipatov (2 May 1940, in Leningrad – 4 September 2017, in Dubna) was a Russian physicist, well known for his contributions to nuclear physics and particle physics. He has been the head of Theoretical Physics Division  at St. Petersburg's Nuclear Physics Institute of Russian Academy of Sciences in Gatchina and an Academician of the Russian Academy of Sciences.

For the long period he worked with Vladimir Gribov, laying a basis for a field theory description of deep inelastic scattering and annihilation (Gribov-Lipatov evolution equations, later known as DGLAP, 1972). He wrote significant papers of the Pomeranchuk singularity in Quantum chromodynamics (1977) what resulted in deriving the BFKL evolution equation (Balitsky-Fadin-Kuraev-Lipatov),  contributed to the study of critical phenomena (semiclassical Lipatov's approximation), the theory of tunnelling and renormalon contribution to effective couplings. He discovered the connection between high-energy scattering and the exactly solvable models (1994).

Awards
 High Energy and Particle Physics Prize (2015)
Pomeranchuk Prize (2001)

See also
 BFKL pomeron
 Relativistic Heavy Ion Collider
 Renormalon

References

External links 
Diakonov QCD scattering: from DGLAP to BFKL, CERN Courier, July 2010

1940 births
2017 deaths
Russian nuclear physicists
Full Members of the Russian Academy of Sciences
Particle physicists
People from Saint Petersburg